"Stay Beautiful" is a song by Welsh alternative rock band Manic Street Preachers, released on 29 July 1991 by record label Columbia as the first single from the band's debut album, Generation Terrorists.

Content 

The track started out under the working title of "Generation Terrorists" and originally featured the lyrics "Why don't you just fuck off" in the chorus, which was later cut to "Why don't you just... [gap]" in the released version with a guitar fill in the aforementioned gap. It has since become customary for fans to shout the original lyric when the band occasionally perform the song live.

Marc Burrows of Drowned in Sound proclaimed "Stay Beautiful" a "straightforward punker", and "the most pure punk record in their arsenal" alongside "Repeat", and that it had "more in common with their earlier indie-label records [...] than it does with its parent album".

Music video 

The music video for the song features the band performing inside a garishly coloured house being splashed with paint, before the setting is demolished by a clay-mation space octopus at the conclusion; referencing themes and events in Alan Moore's Watchmen.

Release 

"Stay Beautiful" was released as a single on 29 July 1991 by record label Columbia. The single crept into the UK Singles Chart, reaching number 40 on 10 August 1991. It was re-issued six years later but failed again to make the top 40, reaching number 52 on 13 September 1997.

The B-sides for all formats included "R.P. McMurphy", with the CD and 12-inch versions adding "Soul Contamination". The title of "R.P. McMurphy" is based on the protagonist of Ken Kesey's 1962 novel One Flew Over the Cuckoo's Nest (which was subsequently made into a film).

Influence 

The title of "Stay Beautiful" was used by Renault in a television advertisement for a car in reference to the song. There is also a bar/club in London named Stay Beautiful in reference to the song. During his solo tour, bassist Nicky Wire performed there.

Longtime music press champion of the band Simon Price co-created alternative "glam/rock/trash" nightclub Stay Beautiful. Named after the song, it drew heavily on the ethos and attitudes of the band.

Track listing 

 CD version

 12" version

 7" version

Charts 

 UK chart performance

References 

1991 singles
Manic Street Preachers songs
Columbia Records singles
Songs written by Richey Edwards
Songs written by James Dean Bradfield
Songs written by Sean Moore (musician)
Songs written by Nicky Wire